The 2022 Europe Top 16 Cup (also referred to as the 2022 CCB Europe Top 16 Cup for sponsorship reasons) is a table tennis competition to be held on 26th and 27th February 2022 in Montreux, Switzerland, organised under the authority of the European Table Tennis Union (ETTU).

Medallists

References

External links
ITTF website

Europe Top 16 Cup
Europe Top 16 Cup
Europe Top 16 Cup
Table tennis competitions in Switzerland
International sports competitions hosted by Switzerland
Sport in Montreux
Europe Top 16 Cup